Famara is the main mountainous massif in the north of the island of Lanzarote in the Canary Islands. It is the eastern slope of a volcano erupting in the Miocene. The cliffs of Famara (Risco de Famara) are the remains of a caldera of about ten kilometres in diameter centred on the south of La Graciosa.

The cliffs of Famara peak at an altitude of 671 m at the Peñas del Chache. A village at the range's seaside is Caleta de Famara, part of Teguise.

Playa de Famara 

The beach south of the cliffs of Famara, the Playa de Famara, is one of sand and volcanic pebbles. It is two kilometres long. Its orientation towards the Atlantic Ocean makes it suitable for the practice of surfing.

A popular seaside resort, Caleta de Famara, has been built here. It is part of the Teguise municipality.

Environment 
The coast north of Famara beach is closed by cliffs and inaccessible to vehicles. It is a remarkable biodiversity site, with about ten species of endemic plants at the site.

All the cliffs of Famara and its coastline are integrated into the natural park of the Chinijo Archipelago.

Endemic plants 
There are about ten species of endemic plants on the coastal plain at the foot of the Famara cliffs. This endemism has been fostered by isolation dating back more than a million years.

Pollution 

Exposed to currents from the west, Famara Beach is a site of waste accumulation from the North Atlantic garbage patch

References

Bibliography

External links 
 Risco de Famara
 Geomorfología del Risco de Famara. Web oficial del Cabildo. Pag. 1 y 2
 Playa de Famara. Ayto. de Teguise

Mountain ranges of Spain
Mountains of the Canary Islands